Eemil Tapio "Tapsa" Hämäläinen (18 June 1922, in Uukuniemi – 28 January 2008, in Helsinki) was a Finnish actor and theater counsellor.

Career
Hämäläinen's best known roles were as Salo in The Unknown Soldier (The Unknown Soldier) and Councillor Tuura in the Uuno Turhapuro films (1976–1993, 2004). Hämäläinen also appeared in many television series, such as Naapurilähiö. He gave his voice to The Hemulen, The Police Inspector and The Groke in the Finnish dub of the Moomin TV series.

Hämäläinen played Uuno Turhapuro's father-in-law Councillor Tuura in 17 Turhapuro films. Hämäläinen was tired of Tuura's role in the 1990s after shooting films for five years followed by a 23-episode television series.

1922 births
2008 deaths
People from Parikkala
Finnish male film actors
Finnish male voice actors
Finnish male television actors
Deaths from dementia in Finland
Deaths from Alzheimer's disease
Deaths from emphysema